Yu-Gi-Oh! Sevens is the seventh main anime series in the Yu-Gi-Oh! franchise and the tenth anime series overall. It is produced by Bridge and broadcast on TV Tokyo. The series is directed by Nobuhiro Kondo. The series follows Yūga and his friends as they show off the delights of Rush Duels while under the watchful eye of the Goha Corporation that oversees the city.



Episode list

Home media release

Japanese

Notes

References

Sevens (season 2)
2021 Japanese television seasons
2022 Japanese television seasons